Figure Number Five is the fifth studio album by Swedish melodic death metal band Soilwork. The record was released on 22 April 2003 through Nuclear Blast label. On this release, the band introduces more elements of alternative metal into their melodic death metal style. This would be the last album with Henry Ranta on drums before he left the band after its release.

A few different editions of this album existed upon release. The normal release with eleven tracks, as well as a limited edition release with a second CD including their 1997 demo In Dreams We Fall into the Eternal Lake plus two songs from the Steelbath Suicide demo session. The limited vinyl version of the album features two discs - this album and Natural Born Chaos, black and the other a white-colored vinyl. The Japanese version of the album includes one bonus track, entitled "Bursting Out".

Background
This album marked keyboardist Sven Karlsson's first attempts at songwriting for the band. While it is not necessarily interconnected with the keyboardist songwriting, this album features more use of the keyboard and lighter melodies. The album is considered a more commercial sound by most fans of Swedish death metal, but it arguably gives the music a broader appeal. However, vocalist Björn Strid has said the album has good melodies but lacks in intensity and could have been better composed; many fans and critics considered the album "rushed".

Music videos were made for the songs "Rejection Role" and "Light the Torch". The music video for "Rejection Role" showed the band playing in a club and being constantly pestered and booed by the members of In Flames, with interspersed footage of other incidents between the two bands. In Flames's video for "Trigger" showed the situation vice versa, In Flames playing and Soilwork as the bullies. The colour is also reversed in each video: blue for In Flames, red for Soilwork. Both videos also had the other band riding in a pickup truck to and from the club. While some believed the tension between the two bands to be real, in reality the groups are close friends and devised the idea of a dual-video concept as a joke.

This was the last album to feature Henry Ranta on drums.

Reception
In 2005, Figure Number Five was ranked number 398 in Rock Hard magazine's book The 500 Greatest Rock & Metal Albums of All Time.

Track listing

Charts

Personnel

Band members
 Björn "Speed" Strid − Vocals
 Peter Wichers − Guitars
 Ola Frenning − Guitars
 Ola Flink − Bass guitar
 Sven Karlsson − Keyboards
 Henry Ranta − Drums

Guest musicians
 Jens Broman − Guest vocals on "Figure Number Five"
 Richard Larsson − Tambourine on "Brickwalker"
 Bryan Kaschak - Guitar on "Cranking the Sirens"

Release history

References

Soilwork albums
2003 albums
Nuclear Blast albums